Myrne is an urban-type settlement in Melitopol Raion of Zaporizhzhia Oblast in Ukraine. It is located on the right bank of the Molochna. Myrne hosts the administration of Myrne settlement hromada, one of the hromadas of Ukraine. Population:

Economy

Transportation

The settlement has access to highway M18 which connects Zaporizhzhia and Melitopol.

References

Urban-type settlements in Melitopol Raion